John Bernard Fitzpatrick (November 1, 1812 – February 13, 1866) was an American bishop of the Roman Catholic Church. He served as Bishop of Boston from 1846 until his death in 1866.

Early life and education
Fitzpatrick was born in Boston, Massachusetts, to parents who came to the United States from King's County (County Offaly), Ireland, in 1805. His father was a tailor and his maternal grandfather served in a Massachusetts regiment during the American Revolution. After attending local primary schools, he was a pupil at the Boston Latin School from 1826 to 1829, during which time he distinguished himself for his studies and virtue.

At the suggestion of Bishop Benedict Joseph Fenwick, S.J., Fitzpatrick then enrolled at Petit Seminaire, run by the Sulpician Fathers, in Montreal, Quebec, Canada. In addition to his studies, Fitzpatrick was named professor of rhetoric and belles-lettres during his fourth year. He was also fluent in Latin, Greek, and French by this time. After graduating from Montreal in 1837, he entered the Seminary of St. Sulpice in Paris, France, where he did his theological studies.

Priesthood
While still in Paris, Fitzpatrick was ordained to the priesthood on June 13, 1840. He returned to Boston the following November, and was assigned as a curate at Holy Cross Cathedral and St. Mary's Church in the North End. At that time, St. Mary's was troubled by two contending pastors and even placed under interdict after one faction interrupted a Mass of the opposing priest. In 1842 he became pastor of East Cambridge, where he erected a church.

Episcopacy
On November 21, 1843, Fitzpatrick was appointed Coadjutor Bishop of Boston and Titular Bishop of Callipolis by Pope Gregory XVI. He received his episcopal consecration on March 24, 1844 from Bishop Fenwick, with Bishops Richard Vincent Whelan and William Tyler serving as co-consecrators, at Georgetown. Fitzpatrick then assumed many of Fenwick's duties, including administering Confirmation, conducting episcopal visitations, investigating parish affairs, and preaching at the cathedral. In 1844, he received philosopher and author Orestes Brownson into the Catholic Church. He also attended the Sixth Provincial Council of Baltimore (1846) in Fenwick's absence.

Fitzpatrick succeeded Fenwick as the third Bishop of Boston upon the latter's death on August 11, 1846. The native Bostonian was warmly received his parishioners, and became popularly known as "Bishop John." His visitations in 1847 extended over nearly all his diocese, which then included the states of Massachusetts, Vermont, New Hampshire, and Maine. Following the outbreak of the Great Irish Famine, Fitzpatrick strongly encouraged Catholics to contribute to the relief effort in Ireland, declaring, "Apathy and indifference, on an occasion like this, are inseparable from crime!"; he later sent $20,000 to Archbishop William Crolly.

Fitzpatrick's tenure also coincided with anti-Catholic Know Nothing movement. He petitioned Mayor Josiah Quincy, Jr. to allow Catholic priests to visit dying inmates at Deer Island, and protested when Catholics were either forced to pay an extra tax or outright rejected when purchasing cemetery plots. When a Catholic child was beaten for refusing to recite a Protestant version of the Ten Commandments at a Boston public school, the Bishop encouraged the child's parents to pursue a lawsuit. Priests, such as Johannes Bapst of Ellsworth, were tarred and feathered, and churches were burned at Dorchester, Manchester, and Bath. Fitzpatrick cautioned Catholics to take non-violent forms of opposition to this discrimination, lest they should add more fuel to the Know Nothing movement. In 1853 the Dioceses of Burlington and Portland were carved out of the Diocese of Boston.

In June 1855 Fitzpatrick appointed Rev. James Augustine Healy, the first African American to be ordained a priest, as the first chancellor of the Boston Diocese. During the Civil War (1861–1865), he supported President Abraham Lincoln and the Union, and made a special effort to provide Catholic chaplains for the Massachusetts regiments. He visited Belgium in 1862 for what he claimed as health reasons; however, others (including Ambrose Dudley Mann and Henry Shelton Sanford) believed he was working for the Union cause in Europe. The diocesan newspaper declared, "Boston participates in the joy that pervades the whole country" when General Robert E. Lee surrendered to Lt. General Ulysses S. Grant at the Appomattox Court House.

During his 20-year-long tenure, Fitzpatrick raised the number of both priests and churches from 40 to 300; established an orphanage, hospital, college; and increased the number of religious communities fivefold. After his health began to fail, he received John Joseph Williams as his coadjutor and later died at age 53.

References

External links

Episcopal succession

1812 births
1866 deaths
Roman Catholic clergy from Boston
American Roman Catholic clergy of Irish descent
19th-century Roman Catholic bishops in the United States
Roman Catholic bishops of Boston
Burials in Massachusetts